Kilsyth Old station served the town of Kilsyth in Scotland. It was the original terminus of the Kelvin Valley Railway.

History 
The station opened as Kilsyth on 1 January 1878 by the Kilsyth and Bonnybridge Railway. It was renamed to Kilsyth (Old) in 1888, renamed Kilsyth in 1936 and it closed on 6 August 1951.

References

External links 

Disused railway stations in North Lanarkshire
Former North British Railway stations
Railway stations in Great Britain opened in 1878
Railway stations in Great Britain closed in 1951
1878 establishments in Scotland
1951 disestablishments in Scotland
Kilsyth